Todi (Tuder in antiquity) is a town and comune (municipality) of the province of Perugia (region of Umbria) in central Italy. It is perched on a tall two-crested hill overlooking the east bank of the river Tiber, commanding distant views in every direction. It was founded in antiquity by the Umbri, at the border with Etruria; the family of Roman Emperor Trajan came from Todi.

In the 1990s, Richard S. Levine, a professor of Architecture at the University of Kentucky, included Todi in academic design exercises aimed at conceiving hypothetical improvements to the city and presented its results in a conference titled "The Sustainable City of the Past and the Sustainable City of the Future". As a result, the Italian press incorrectly reported on Todi as the world's most livable city.

History
According to the legend, said to have been recorded around 1330 BC by a mythological Quirinus Colonus, Todi was built by Hercules, who here killed Cacus, and gave the city the name of Eclis.

Historical Todi was founded by the ancient Italic people of the Umbri, in the 8th-7th century BC, with the name of Tutere. The name means "border", the city being located on the frontier with the Etruscan dominions. It probably was still under the latters' influence when it was conquered by the Romans in 217 BC. According to Silius Italicus, it had a double line of walls that stopped Hannibal himself after his victory at Lake Trasimeno. In most Latin texts, the name of the town took the form Tuder. 

A notable archeologic find from the Etruscan period is an ancient bronze, the Mars of Todi, discovered in 1835 in the nearby Montesanto; and now at the Gregorian Etruscan section of the Vatican Museums, but a copy is kept in the crypt of the Cathedral.

It was the home of Trajan's family, the Ulpi Traiani. Christianity spread to Todi very early, through the efforts of St. Terentianus. Bishop St. Fortunatus became the patron saint of the city for his heroic defence of it during the Gothic siege. In Lombard times, Todi was part of the Duchy of Spoleto.

After the 12th century, the city started to expand again: the government was held first by consuls, and then by podestà and a people's captain, some of whom achieved wide fame. In 1244 the new quarters, housing mainly the new artisan classes, were enclosed in a new circle of walls.

Benedetto Caetani, the latter Pope Boniface VIII, started his career as a Canon in the Cathedral of Todi in 1260. He never forgot his roots in Todi, later describing the city as "the dwelling place of my early youth," the city which "nourished me while still of tender years," and as a place where he "held lasting memories."

In 1290 the city had 40,000 inhabitants. Communal autonomy was lost in 1367 when the city was annexed to the Papal States: the local overlordship shifted among various families (the Tomacelli, the Malatesta, Braccio da Montone, Francesco Sforza and others). Although reduced to half of its former population, Todi lived a brief period of splendour under bishop Angelo Cesi, who rebuilt several edifices or added new ones, like the Cesia Fountain that still bears his name.

In July 1849 Todi received Giuseppe Garibaldi, who was fleeing after the failed democratic attempt of the Republic of Rome.

Todi is the birthplace of the Franciscan poet Jacopone da Todi, who is buried in a special crypt in the church of S. Fortunato.

Monuments and sites of interest

Almost all Todi's main medieval monuments – the co-cathedral church (Duomo), the Palazzo del Capitano, the Palazzo del Priore and the Palazzo del Popolo – front on the main square (Piazza del Popolo) on the lower breast of the hill: the piazza is often used as a movie set. The whole landscape is sited over some huge ancient Roman cisterns, with more than 500 pits, which remained in use until 1925.

Todi has been over the ages been surrounded by three more or less complete concentric walls: the outermost is medieval, the middle wall is Roman, and the innermost is recognizable as partly Etruscan. Sights include also a colossal Roman niched substructure of uncertain purpose (the Nicchioni), the small remnants of a Roman amphitheatre, about a dozen smaller churches, and a few Renaissance or classical palazzi, among which the most important is one by Vignola. In the country outside of the city has many historical castles, fortresses and ancient churches including the famous Todi Castle.

Religious architecture or sites 

Todi Cathedral: (11th century) Gothic church built at the site of a Lombard church, itself erected over an ancient Roman temple to Apollo. The present church rebuilt after a fire in 1190. The nearly square façade has a large central rose window (1513). Of the same period is the wooden door of the portal, by Antonio Bencivenni from Mercatello, of which only the four upper panels remain today. The church follows the plan of the Latin cross, with a nave and two aisles. Bonifacio VIII allegedly had a second aisle on one side, commonly known as "La navatina". The large fresco depicting the Universal Judgment on the counter-facade was commissioned by Cardinal Angelo Cesi from Ferraù Faenzone, called "Il Faenzone", influenced by the mannerism of Michelangelo. The choir includes the Gothic altar and a magnificent wooden choir-enclosure (1521) with two floors. One important work of art is the 13th-century Crucifixion of the Umbrian school.

San Carlo: small Romanesque and Gothic-style church on Viale San Carlo.
San Fortunato: Paleo-Christian temple (7th century) church on a hilltop of the city, standing along the ruins of a medieval fortress (Rocca). Flanking the entrance portal to San Fortunato are two lion sculptures. In 1292 the construction of a new Gothic edifice was begun by the Franciscans, with a "hall" structure. The plague of 1348 halted work. The lower part of the façade was finished in the second half of the 15th century. The nave and the two aisles have a portal each: these are enriched by fine decorations portraying saints and prophets, with briars representing Good (the vine) and Evil (the fig). The whole apse is occupied by a wooden choir finished in 1590 by Antonio Maffei, from Gubbio. The crypt houses a sepulchre containing the remains of St Fortunatus of Todi and other saints, as well as the tomb of Jacopone da Todi. A chapel has frescoes of a Madonna and Child by Masolino da Panicale.
Santa Maria della Consolazione: (begun 1508) domed Renaissance church located on the flank of the hill, just outside the walls. It is often attributed, although without sufficient reason, to Bramante. It has a Greek cross plan: three apses are polygonal and that on the north side is semicircular. Architects who worked on it include Cola da Caprarola, Antonio da Sangallo the Younger, Baldassarre Peruzzi, Galeazzo Alessi, Michele Sanmicheli, Vignola and Ippolito Scalza. The church was inaugurated only in 1607. The apse is surmounted by a square terrace with 4 eagles at the corners, from which the dome rises. In the interior, the altar houses a miraculous image of the Madonna, which according to the tradition, was discovered by a worker during the founding works. 12 niches in the first three apses house giant statues of the apostles. Also noteworthy is the wooden statue of Pope Martin I, native to the Todi area.
Santa Maria in Camuccia: Romanesque and Gothic-style, Roman Catholic church on Via Santa Maria in Camuccia.

Secular and civic architecture or sites 
Palazzo del Popolo ("People's Palace") is a Lombard-Gothic construction that already existed in 1213, and is one of the most ancient communal palaces in Italy. It comprises two great halls: the "Sala Grande Inferiore", or "Sala delle Pietre", and the "Sala Grande Superiore", housing the city's Art Gallery.
Palazzo del Capitano, Todi: ("Captain's Palace"), built circa 1293 in Italian Gothic style, and named "New Communal Palace" to differentiate it from the former one. It is on two distinct levels: the first floor housed the Justice Hall (currently, seat of the Communal Council), with the Judges's offices on the lower. The latter is now occupied by the City Museum, with findings and remains of Todi's history. It includes a saddle used by Anita Garibaldi, the wife of Giuseppe Garibaldi. Some rooms are frescoed with histories of the city and portraits of its most illustrious men.
Palazzo dei Priori: located on the southern side of the Piazza, facing the Cathedral. It was begun in 1293 and later enlarged as the seat of the podestà, priors and the Papal governors. The trapezoidal tower was originally lower and had Guelph merlons. The façade includes a big bronze eagle by Giovanni di Giliaccio (1347).
Palazzo Vescovile: Located at the left of the Cathedral, the Bishop's Palace was built in 1593 by Cardinal Angelo Cesi at his own expense. His crest is visible over the great portal, attributed to Vignola. The upper floors include a room frescoed by Ferraù Fenzoni and a gallery frescoed by Andrea Polinori in 1629.

Sports

A.S.D. Todi Calcio
Associazione Sportiva Dilettantistica Todi Calcio  is an Italian association football club, based in the city.

Todi currently plays in Serie D group E.

References

External links

Official website
UmbriaOnline
Todi - Bella Umbria
 San Fortunato Church
Bill Thayer's site

 
Cittaslow
Hilltowns in Umbria
Roman sites of Umbria
Renaissance architecture in Umbria
Gothic sites in Umbria